Propioniciclava tarda is a Gram-positive, non-spore-forming, facultatively anaerobic and non-motile bacterium from the genus Propioniciclava which has been isolated from rice-straw in Hokkaido, Japan.

References 

Propionibacteriales
Bacteria described in 2011